Stefan Kovačević (born 2 February 1994) is a Serbian football midfielder who plays for Žarkovo.

Club career
Born in Čačak, Kovačević passed youth school of local club Borac. After spending the 2011–12 season on loan at Beograd, he moved to Sloboda Čačak for the next season, where he scored 12 goals on 26 caps in the Serbian League West. In summer 2013, Kovačević signed a professional contract with Serbian SuperLiga club OFK Beograd. During the 2013–14 season, Kovačević made 3 appearances, but missed the mostly time in 2014 because of a knee injury. For the next year, Kovačević moved to Sloboda Užice on loan. At the beginning of 2016, Kovačević moved to OFK Bačka, where he spent the spring half of 2015–16 Serbian First League season, as a loaned player. Later, in summer of the same year, he joined the club as a single player. In January 2017, Kovačević joined FK Inđija.

Career statistics

References

External links
 
 

1994 births
Living people
Sportspeople from Čačak
Association football midfielders
Serbian footballers
FK Beograd players
OFK Beograd players
FK Sloboda Užice players
OFK Bačka players
FK Inđija players
Serbian First League players
Serbian SuperLiga players